Masked Singer Sverige is the second season of the Swedish version of Masked Singer started on 25 March 2022 on TV4. David Hellenius returns as presenter of the show while Nour El Refai, Felix Herngren, Pernilla Wahlgren and Måns Zelmerlöw all return as jury.

Contestants

Episodes

Week 1 (25 March)

Week 2 (1 April)

Week 3 (8 April)

Week 4 (15 April)

Week 5 (22 April)

Week 6 (29 April)

Week 7 (6 May)

Week 8 (14 May) 
 Guest Performance: "Stay" by The Kid Laroi as performed by Amadeus Sögaard as Bläckfisken

Week 9 (20 May) – Final 
 Group number: "The Nights" by Avicii (Spelmannen), "Move Your Feet" by Junior Senior (Trollkarlen), "Survivor" by Destiny's Child (Sagoträdet), "Made Of" by Nause (Final 3)

References

External links 

2022 Swedish television seasons
Masked Singer
TV4 (Sweden) original programming